Kriton Ilyadis (16 January 1916 - 1 September 1980) was a Turkish cinematographer of Greek origin.

He was responsible for the cinematography of 115 films between 1944 and 1973.

External links
 

Anatolian Greeks
Turkish cinematographers
1916 births
1980 deaths
People from Adapazarı